Birgit Finnilä (born 20 January 1931) is a Swedish contralto and opera singer.

Finnilä was born in Falkenberg, Sweden and studied at the Royal Academy of Music in London. She made her operatic debut in Gothenburg in 1967.  Though principally singing concert works, her operatic roles include parts in Britten's The Rape of Lucretia, Gluck's Orfeo ed Euridice, Handel's Flavio, Mozart's Le Nozze di Figaro, and Wagner's Ring cycle.

Recordings 
 Baroque and Romantic Vocal Music BIS-CD-127, singing Sea Pictures by Sir Edward Elgar
 Dvorák/Fernström Big Ben 571-006 4 (861-006 2), singing Biblical Songs, Op. 99 by Antonín Dvořák

External links
Biography from Bach-Cantatas.com

1931 births
Contraltos
Living people
Swedish women singers
Swedish opera singers
Operatic contraltos
People from Falkenberg
Alumni of the Royal Academy of Music